Silk Road Gallery is a photography gallery in Tehran, Iran. It is the first gallery in Iran devoted exclusively to contemporary photography.

The gallery was opened in December 2001 by Anahita Ghabaian Etehadieh with the collaboration of Minou Saberi (1938–2010). It has had an active role in the development of the new artistic movement in Iranian photography of the past decade by providing a sort of laboratory in which new ideas and methods are discussed, shaped, and formed. Many famed Iranian Photographers such as the late Bahman Jalali and Shadi Ghadirian have collaborated with the gallery while a younger generation have sprung up.

Silk Road Gallery has had a fair deal of success in presenting Iranian photographers to the international audience by participating in various fairs and exhibitions such as Paris Photo (2001, 2010, 2009, 2004), Arco (2009 and 2007), Art Dubai (2009 and 2008), Art Abu Dhabi/Art Paris Abu Dhabi (2010, 2008, 2007), and Photoquai (2007 and 2009).

The tenth anniversary of the gallery was marked by the publication of a book in French, on contemporary Iranian Photography called "La photographie iranienne, Un Regard sur la creation contemporaine en Iran".

References

External links
Official website

2001 establishments in Iran
Art galleries established in 2001
Photography museums and galleries in Iran
Contemporary art galleries in Iran
Buildings and structures in Tehran
Tourist attractions in Tehran
Culture in Tehran